Trimonoecy, also called polygamomonoecious, is when male, female, and hermaphrodite flowers are on the same plant. Trimonoecy is rare.

It is a monomorphic sexual system along with monoecy, gynomonoecy, and andromonoecy. It is hypothesized that trimonoecy originated from  gynomonoecy.

Occurrence 
Trimonoecy occurs in plant families like Anacardiaceae, Apiaceae, Araliaceae, Chenopodiaceae, Fabaceae, Orchidaceae, Palmae, and more. It is rare in the family Commelinaceae.

Trimonoecious species 
Trimonoecious species include.

 Cocos nucifera
Sanguisorba minor
Thymelaea hirsuta
There is evidence Phyllanthus acidus is trimonoecious.

Plant reproductive system

References 

Sexual system